Presidential Orchestra of the Republic of Belarus (Прэзідэнцкі аркестр Рэспублікі Беларусь) is a Belarusian orchestra which is made up of graduates of the Belarusian State Academy of Music (BSAM), the Belarusian State University of Culture and the Minsk Music School. It is one of three major symphonic orchestras in the country. It was founded on August 6, 2002.

The principal conductor and artistic director of the orchestra since September 2002 is Viktor Babarikin, a 2008 graduate of the Belarusian State Academy of Music Department of Opera-Symphonic Conducting. It performs songs such as Muslim Magomayev to Pyotr Ilyich Tchaikovsky.

Composition
It is made up of 57 musicians:

 2 flutes
 2 oboes
 2 clarinets
 2 bassoons
 4 saxophones
 4 horns
 4 trumpets
 4 trombones
 2 percussions
 2 guitars
 1 bass guitar
 2 synthesizers
 6 first violins
 5 second violins
 4 violas
 5 cellos
 2 double-basses

See also
 Central Band of the Armed Forces of the Republic of Belarus
 Music of Belarus
 Wind orchestra
 String orchestra

References

External links 
 Viktor Babarikin on Youtube
 The Belorussian station - by the Presidential Orchestra of the Republic of Belarus

Belarusian musical groups
Musical groups established in 2002